The Air Line Pilots Association, International (ALPA) is the largest pilot union in the world, representing more than 67,000 pilots from 39 U.S. and Canadian airlines. ALPA was founded on 27 July 1931 and is a member of the AFL-CIO and the Canadian Labour Congress. Known internationally as U.S.-ALPA, ALPA is also a member of the IFALPA.

History
ALPA was founded by Captain David L. Behncke and 23 other key figures in Chicago, Illinois, on July 27, 1931. In the 1930s, flying was a perilous occupation; thus, from the time of its formation, one of ALPA’s main goals was to improve air safety.

In 1933, the decision by the National Labor Board to limit the flight time for pilots and co-pilots to 85 hours a month was the result of the union’s first major lobbying campaign to make the skies safer. By the end of the ‘30s, the association had persuaded numerous airlines to form air traffic control centers, and had started the Airworthiness and Performance Committee, the first ALPA technical committee dedicated to improving flight safety.

In the 1940s, numerous ALPA pilots enlisted in the military to help the United States battle the Axis powers during World War II. In this decade, ALPA created additional air safety committees, and the newly established International Federation of Air Line Pilots’ Associations (IFALPA) worked to improve flight safety around the world.

In 1951, ALPA created an internal air safety system, which developed into the world’s biggest independent, nongovernmental safety structure. During the 1950s, jet travel was introduced, marking a new period for the air industry. In this era, crew fatigue became a greater concern for pilots, with the union successfully persuading the Civil Aeronautics Board to stop airlines from scheduling impractical flights.

During the 1960s, jet transport of people and goods became commonplace, with ALPA addressing the new safety issues that came with this type of travel. In 1961, ALPA’s second president, Clarence N. Sayen, directly asked new U.S. President John F. Kennedy to make hijacking a federal crime, which subsequently became the law of the land in September of that year. The Southern Airways strike of 1960-62, a conflict that ALPA winningly took on in a dispute over pilot wages, is the longest walkout in the union’s history. For years, ALPA had lobbied hard for the creation of an independent government agency that would investigate accidents, and in 1967, the National Transportation Safety Board was established to conduct such investigations.

In 1972, ALPA began an anti-skyjacking lobby offensive, among other efforts to fight air terrorism, which was all too common in the early 1970s. Also in 1972, after decades of campaigning by ALPA, the Federal Aviation Administration (FAA) established an airport certification program, which required airport operators to prove they are following safety standards. In 1976, the union’s dedicated work resulted in NASA creating the Aviation Safety Reporting System (ASRS), a database of confidential incident reports.

During the 1980s, ALPA accomplished much in the way of safety. In 1981, among other achievements, the Association convinced the FAA that “fasten seatbelt” signs were needed, and in 1987, the FAA again heeded calls from the union, requiring the installation of a traffic collision avoidance system (TCAS) in every airplane. On March 4, 1989, ALPA pilots at Eastern Airlines went on strike in support of the International Association of Machinists. The pilots stood their ground for 285 days.

Following the 1994 crash of USAir Flight 427, in which all 132 people on board were killed, the NTSB ruled that pilot error was the cause. But ALPA fought that decision, and in the end, it was found that a malfunction in the rudder control system of the B-737 plane was likely the cause. Subsequently, a redesign of all B-737’s—the most commonly flown commercial airplane—was ordered by the FAA. After another tragic 1994 crash, of American Eagle Flight 4184, a study of icing issues with the ATR 72 commenced, an inquiry ALPA was closely involved with. The outcomes were alterations in the design of the ATR 72 and improved pilot training. ALPA’s chief accomplishment of the 1990s was the 1995 enactment of the “One Level of Safety” program by the FAA, resulting in stricter safety rules for smaller airplanes. ALPA came up with the name for the program and lobbied hard for the measure.

In 1997, the Canadian Airline Pilots Association (CALPA) merged with ALPA, forming what would become known as ALPA Canada. As of 2020, ALPA Canada represents more than 5,000 pilots.

In 2000, after years of advocacy by the association, the FAA approved ALPA’s recommendations for Land and Hold Short Operations (LAHSO). In the wake of the catastrophic September 11, 2001 terrorist attacks, improving airline security would be ALPA’s main priority for the next several years. This concentrated effort by the union included the formation of their Security Task Force, instrumental in the creation of numerous new security rules.

During the 2010s, ALPA continued to campaign for improvements in airline security and safety. One such issue was the deliberate and dangerous act of pointing lasers at pilots in the air. Thanks to ALPA’s efforts, a new law was enacted making this undertaking a federal crime.

In 2020, amidst the COVID-19 outbreak, ALPA pressed governments in the United States and Canada to pass legislation that would protect airline employees. The association was actively involved in the talks that resulted in the CARES Act, which stabilized the aviation industry and provided economic relief for pilots.

Current leadership
ALPA's four international officers were elected by the union's Board of Directors on Oct. 19, 2022, and began their four-year terms on Jan. 1, 2023.

President: Captain Jason Ambrosi 
Captain Jason Ambrosi, Delta Air Lines, is ALPA's twelfth president. He previously served as chair of the Delta pilots’ Master Executive Council. While employed by a charter airline, Captain Ambrosi was a strong supporter of labor representation and helped create a culture of safety.

First Vice President: Captain Wendy Morse 
Captain Wendy Morse, United Airlines, is ALPA's first vice president and national safety coordinator. At United, Captain Morse served as Master Executive Council chair, and held many other positions of leadership.

Vice President–Administration/Secretary: Captain Tyler Hawkins 
Captain Tyler Hawkins Frontier Airlines, is ALPA's vice president–administration/secretary. At Frontier, Captain Hawkins previously represented ALPA on the Master Executive Council, and was the chair of the Strategic Preparedness and Strike Committee.

Vice President–Finance/Treasurer: Captain Wes Clapper 
Captain Wes Clapper, JetBlue, is ALPA's vice president–finance/treasurer. Captain Clapper previously served in several leadership roles at JetBlue, and recently was the Group A executive vice president for the union.

Archives
The Walter P. Reuther Library is home to over 40 collections of archival material documenting the history of the Air Line Pilots Association. To access the collections' finding aids, please refer to the ALPA-related content at the Walter P. Reuther Library's website.

Former Presidents
The following is a complete list of ALPA's former presidents since the Association's founding in 1931:

 Joe DePete (2019–2022)
 Tim Canoll (2015 – 2018)
 Lee Moak (2011 – 2014)
 John H. Prater (2007 – 2010)
 Duane E. Woerth (1999 – 2006)
 J. Randolph Babbitt (1991 – 1998)
 Henry A. Duffy (1983 – 1990)
 John J. O'Donnell (1971 – 1982)
 Charles H. Ruby (1962 – 1970)
 Clarence N. Sayen (1951 – 1962)
 David L. Behncke (1931 – 1951)

Member pilot groups
ALPA represents the following bargaining units:

 Air Transat
 Air Transport International
 Air Wisconsin Airlines
 Alaska Airlines
 Amerijet International
 Bearskin Airlines
 Breeze Airways
 Calm Air
 Canadian North
 Cargojet
 CommuteAir
 Delta Air Lines
 Endeavor Air
 Envoy Air
 FedEx Express
 First Air
 Flair Airlines
 Frontier Airlines
 Hawaiian Airlines
 iAero Airways
 Jazz
 JetBlue Airways
 Kalitta Air
 Kelowna Flightcraft Ltd.
 Mesa Air Group
 Morningstar Air Express Inc.
 PAL Airlines
 Perimeter Aviation
 Piedmont Airlines
 Pivot Airlines
 PSA Airlines
 Ravn Alaska
 Spirit Airlines
 Sun Country Airlines
 United Airlines
 Wasaya
 Western Global
 WestJet
 WestJet Encore

Notes

References

External links
 ALPA national website
 Flying the Line podcast
 Flying the Line: The First Half Century of the Air Line Pilots Association – book by George E. Hopkins
 Flying the Line Volume II: The Line Pilot in Crisis: ALPA Battles Airline Deregulation and Other Forces – book by George E. Hopkins

AFL–CIO
Canadian Labour Congress
Airline pilots' trade unions
Aviation organizations based in the United States
International Federation of Air Line Pilots' Associations
Aviation-related professional associations
Political advocacy groups in the United States
Transportation trade unions in the United States
Trade unions established in 1931